Bavin (wood) was a traditional unit of firewood, a large log, of importance in the Biological Old Regime that preceded fossil fuel.

Description and use
A bavin in the 16thC was a piece of wood standardised as three foot long and two feet round. 
In Hampshire in the early19thC, its cost was between 6 and 15 shillings per hundred bavins.

Charles Vancouver in 1813 wrote of "Bavins for heating the oven and making a sudden but transient fire". 
Bavins were used especially by bakers.

Literary associations
Jane Austen in 1814 complained to her sister that “My Mother’s Wood is brought in-but by some mistake, no Bavins. She must therefore buy some”.

See also
Faggot (unit)
Fascine
Withy

References

External links 
Definition

Firewood

Fuels

Wood fuel